Glenwood School may refer to:
Glenwood School (Alabama)
Glenwood School (Cissna Park, Illinois)
Glenwood School, Winnipeg
Glenwood Elementary and High School in Georgia, now merged with Winder-Barrow High School